Danica Marković (Serbian Cyrillic: Даница Марковић; 1 October 1879 – 9 July 1932) was the first modern Serbian woman lyric poet. She was also important for her feminist writings. Her pseudonym was Zvezdanka.

Biography
The fate of Danica Marković is unusual. After the acclaim which greeted her first volume of poetry, she was largely forgotten in the altered climate of cultural life following the Great War. Her personal experience was harsh: three of her six children died and she was left by her husband to bring up the other three on her own. Neglected for more than 40 years, now after communism, her life story and writings are becoming better known.

During the Great War, she volunteered as a nurse caring for the sick in military field hospitals along with her contemporaries.

Work
 Trenuci (1904) 
 Trenuci i raspoloženja (1928) 
 Elegije (reprint, 1973) 
 Pesme o alhemijskom pokušaju (reprint, 1989) 
 Kupačica i zmija (reprint, 2003) 
 Istorija jednog osećanja, sabrane pesme (reprint, 2006)
 Savremena ispovest (1913)

References

1879 births
1932 deaths
Writers from Čačak
Serbian women poets
20th-century Serbian poets
20th-century Serbian women writers
Feminist writers
20th-century pseudonymous writers
Pseudonymous women writers
Poets from the Kingdom of Serbia